Clervaux is a canton in the north of Luxembourg. Its capital is Clervaux.

Administrative divisions
Clerveaux Canton consists of the following five communes:

 Clervaux
 Parc Hosingen
 Troisvierges
 Weiswampach
 Wincrange

Mergers
 On 1 January 1978 the former communes of Asselborn, Boevange, Hachiville, and Oberwampach (all from Clervaux Canton) were merged to create the commune of Wincrange.  The law creating Wincrange was passed on 31 October 1977.
 On 29 May 2009 the former communes of Heinerscheid and Munshausen (both from Clervaux Canton) were absorbed into the commune of Clervaux. The law expanding Clervaux was passed on 24 May 2011. 
 On 1 January 2012 the former communes of Consthum and Hosingen (both from Clervaux Canton) and Hoscheid (formerly part of Diekirch Canton) were merged to create the commune of Parc Hosingen.  The law creating Parc Hosingen was passed on 24 May 2011.

Population

References

 
Cantons of Luxembourg